Steyn Humphries is a paralympic athlete from South Africa competing mainly in category F55 throws events.

Steyn competed in all three throws at the 1996 Summer Paralympics in Atlanta winning gold in the F55 Discus, silver in the F56 shot put and bronze in the F56 javelin.

References

Paralympic athletes of South Africa
Athletes (track and field) at the 1996 Summer Paralympics
Paralympic gold medalists for South Africa
Paralympic silver medalists for South Africa
Paralympic bronze medalists for South Africa
Living people
Medalists at the 1996 Summer Paralympics
Year of birth missing (living people)
Paralympic medalists in athletics (track and field)
South African male discus throwers
South African male javelin throwers
South African male shot putters
20th-century South African people
21st-century South African people
Wheelchair discus throwers
Wheelchair javelin throwers
Wheelchair shot putters
Paralympic discus throwers
Paralympic javelin throwers
Paralympic shot putters